Tumbledown is a 1988 British television play.

Tumbledown can also refer to:
the Battle of Mount Tumbledown in the Falklands War in 1982
Tumbledown Mountain in Maine, USA
Tumbledown Dick, a nickname given Richard Cromwell, British politician and army officer (1626–1715)
Mike Herrera's Tumbledown an alternative country band
"Tumbledown", a song on The Jesus and Mary Chain's Honey's Dead
Tumbledown (2015 film), a film produced by Bron Studios